Barbara Nicolosi  (born February 20, 1964) is an American screenwriter, script consultant and university professor of cinema and Great Books.

Early life and education
Nicolosi was born in New Brunswick, New Jersey, to Anthony and Hilda Nicolosi. She is the second of four daughters. Her youngest sister is the professional opera singer Valerie Nicolosi. When Barbara was five years old, the family moved to Newport, Rhode Island, where her father took a job as the archivist for the Naval War College. Anthony Nicolosi would go on to found the Naval War College Museum. She has a B.A. from the Great Books program at The College of Saint Mary Magdalen, a master's degree in Radio/TV/Film from Northwestern University and a PhD in Creative Writing from Bath Spa University in Bath, UK.

Career
She won Catholic Press Awards for her media columns in 2002 and 2004. One of her columns was selected for the 2006 Loyola Press release, The Best Catholic Writing of 2005. 

In 2015, Nicolosi accepted a position at Azusa Pacific University as an associate professor in the newly formed Honors College. In 2019 she started a position as associate professor and Director of Screenwriting Programs at Regent University.

From 2014 to 2019, Nicolosi ran Catharsis: The Story Lab, a mentorship and out-sourced development program for visual storytellers. She is founder and Chair Emeritus She was also a founding partner in Origin Entertainment.  She is a member of the Writers Guild of America, West.

Filmography
 Mary Mother of Christ (2013) — co-writer
 A Severe Mercy (development) - Writer
 Fatima (released in 2020) — Writer
 Cosmic Origins (2011) - Executive Producer
 In Memory (short film) - Executive Producer
 Ask J (web series, 2015) - Executive Producer
 Judgmental Moose (web series, 2015) Executive Producer

Television
 Faith Under Fire - Herself (1 episode, 2005)
 Culture Wars (2005) TV episode – Herself
 Saving Grace - theological consultant
 Rated "R": Republicans in Hollywood (2004) (TV) - Herself - interviewee

See also

References

External links

 Church of the Masses, Nicolosi's blog
Act One Program for screenwriters founded by Nicolosi

1964 births
Living people
Screenwriters from California
Screenwriting instructors
Northwestern University School of Communication alumni
Azusa Pacific University faculty
Pepperdine University faculty
Writers from New Brunswick, New Jersey
People from Portsmouth, Rhode Island
Catholics from New Jersey
Catholics from Rhode Island
Screenwriters from New Jersey
Screenwriters from Rhode Island